Preparedness department or variations may refer to:

 Department of Public Safety and Emergency Preparedness (Canada)
 Minister of Public Safety and Emergency Preparedness (Canada)
 Canadian Center for Emergency Preparedness
 Center for Domestic Preparedness (U.S.)
 Center for Public Health Preparedness (U.S.)
 United States House Homeland Security Subcommittee on Emergency Preparedness, Response and Recovery
 Office of the Assistant Secretary for Preparedness and Response (U.S.)
 National Domestic Preparedness Consortium (U.S.) training program
 New Jersey Office of Homeland Security and Preparedness (U.S.)
 Emergency Preparedness Operational Command Unit (UK) of London
 Office of Disaster Preparedness and Emergency Management (Jamaica)
 Ministry of Disaster Preparedness and Refugees (Uganda)
 Disaster Preparedness and Response Team (Pakistan)